Alexander Sergeevich Pankov (born November 17, 1991, Ufa)  is a Russian professional ice hockey player, forward who currently plays for Toros Neftekamsk of the Supreme Hockey League (VHL).

Playing career

Alexander Pankov is the pupil of the Ufa hockey. He began his professional career in 2009 in the club Tolpar Ufa of the Minor Hockey League. In his first season, he played 64 games, scored 41 (19+22)  points and won the bronze medal of the tournament. In the next season he scored 33 (14+19) points in 49 games and won bronze medal of the Minor Hockey League  again. He made his debut in the Kontinental Hockey League (KHL) on 22 December 2010 against Neftekhimik team from Nizhnekamsk. In his first season in the KHL he played 20 games and  scored 6 (5+1)  points, won the Gagarin Cup with the Salavat Yulaev.

He began the 2011/12 season in the club Toros from Neftekamsk (VHL)  but in November he was called to the Salavat Yulaev. He returned to the Toros on December 22, 2011 and won the Bratina Cup. The management of Salavat Yulaev" has decided to extend the bilateral agreement with Pankov on May 3, 2012. In 2015 Pankov moved to the club Avtomobilist (Yekaterinburg)

Awards and honours 
 2010, 2011 Bronze medal: Minor Hockey League  
 2011 Gagarin Cup Champion: Salavat Yulaev Ufa (KHL)
 2012 Bratina Cup: Toros Neftekamsk (VHL)

References

External links 
  Profile at KHL

1991 births
Living people
Russian ice hockey forwards
Ak Bars Kazan players
Avtomobilist Yekaterinburg players
Salavat Yulaev Ufa players
Tolpar Ufa players
Toros Neftekamsk players
Traktor Chelyabinsk players
HC Vityaz players
Sportspeople from Ufa